The 2015 Tianjin Open was a women's professional tennis tournament played on hardcourts. The 2nd edition of the tournament was part of the 2015 WTA Tour. It took place in Tianjin, China between 12 and 18 October 2015.

Points and prize money

Point distribution

Prize money

1 Qualifiers prize money is also the Round of 32 prize money
* per team

Singles main-draw entrants

Seeds 

 1 Rankings are as of October 5, 2015

Other entrants 
The following players received wildcards into the singles main draw:
  Duan Yingying
  Flavia Pennetta
  Zhang Yuxuan

The following players received entry from the qualifying draw:
  Lyudmyla Kichenok
  Nadiia Kichenok
  Olga Savchuk
  Nicole Vaidišová

Withdrawals
Before the tournament
  Belinda Bencic →replaced by  Alla Kudryavtseva
  Alexandra Dulgheru →replaced by  Nao Hibino
  Marina Erakovic →replaced by  Ons Jabeur
  Polona Hercog →replaced by  Patricia Maria Țig
  Monica Niculescu →replaced by  Liu Fangzhou

Doubles main-draw entrants

Seeds 

1 Rankings are as of October 5, 2015

Other entrants
The following pairs received a wildcard into the doubles main draw:
  Xun Fangying /  Wang Yan
  Kang Jiaqi /  Zhang Shuai

The following pair received entry as alternates:
  Elizaveta Kulichkova /  Evgeniya Rodina

Withdrawals
Before the tournament
 Patricia Maria Tig (left wrist injury)

Champions

Singles 

 Agnieszka Radwańska def.  Danka Kovinić 6–1, 6–2

Doubles 

  Xu Yifan /  Zheng Saisai def.  Darija Jurak /  Nicole Melichar 6–2, 3–6, [10–8]

External links 
 

Tianjin Open
Tianjin Open
Tianjin Open